Colquetauca (possibly from Quechua qullqi silver, tawqa heap, pile, "silver heap") is a mountain in the Vilcanota mountain range in the Andes of Peru, about  high. It is located in the Puno Region, Carabaya Province, Macusani District. Colquetauca lies south of the Ninahuisa River.

References

Mountains of Peru
Mountains of Puno Region